Begüm Birgören (born 20 September 1982) is a Turkish actress.

Early life
Begüm Birgören was born on 20 September 1982 in Eskişehir, Turkey. Her maternal family is of Circassian origin. Her father is a teacher, and her mother is an economist. The actress has stated that she has been fascinated in acting since she was 13. She completed her education in Bahçeşehir University Visual Arts and Visual Communication Design. She completed her master's degree at Film and Drama Department at Kadir Has University.

Career
Birgören started her acting career in 1997, when she made her debut in the series Beşibiryerde. In 2003, she appeared in the series Pilli Bebek and depicted the character of Olcay  and Mavi Kolye and portrayed the character of Nil. In 2004, she made her debut in the series Arapsaçı. In 2005, she made her debut in the series Seher Vakti as her first leading role and portrayed the character of Melike, the same year she made her cinematic debut in the film Sen Ne Dilersen and depicted the character of Young Eleni. In 2006, she made her debut in the series Kırık Kanatlar as a main character and portrayed the character of Ayşe. In 2007, she appeared in the series Kara Yılan which was directed by Yağmur Taylan, she portrayed the character of Elvan.

In 2008, she appeared in two series Nokta and portrayed the character of Elif, and  Mert ile Gert and depicted the character of Aslı, in the same year she made her cinematic debut in the movie Ali'nin Sekiz Günü directed by Cemal Şan. In 2009, she portrayed the character of Ömür in the series Ömre Bedel. In 2011, she made her debut in film Türkan. In 2013, she received the award of Best Supporting Actress at Lions Theatre Awards. In 2016, she had a leading role in the series Umuda Kelepçe Vurulmaz and portrayed the character of İnci, it was directed by Cemal Şan, it starred Özge Özder, Mert Yazıcıoğlu, Melisa Şenolsun and Burak Dakak. In 2019, she portrayed the character of Asya in the series Vargun.

Personal life
Birgören dated Mehmet Cemil. The couple got engaged in June 2020. They got married on 18 October 2020.

Filmography

Television

Films

References

External links

Living people
1982 births
Turkish television actresses
21st-century Turkish actresses
Turkish film actresses
People from Eskişehir
Turkish people of Circassian descent
Kadir Has University alumni